Brandon Eugene Maurer (born July 3, 1990) is an American former professional baseball pitcher. He has played in Major League Baseball (MLB) for the Seattle Mariners, San Diego Padres and Kansas City Royals.

From Costa Mesa, California, Maurer pitched in Little League Baseball and high school at Orange Lutheran High School. The Mariners selected Maurer in the 23rd round of the 2008 MLB Draft. After being overshadowed by other prospects, Maurer had a strong spring training showing with the Mariners in 2013, and made the team's Opening Day roster in the starting rotation. The Mariners traded Maurer to the Padres after the 2014 season, and he became a relief pitcher. The Padres traded Maurer to the Royals in 2017. Maurer signed a minor league free agent deal with the Pirates during prior to the 2019 season.

Amateur career
Maurer competed in Little League Baseball in Costa Mesa, California as a pitcher. On July 30, 2002, at the age of 12, Maurer pitched a perfect game in the Little League all-star game.

Maurer attended Orange Lutheran High School in Orange, California. Maurer played for the school's baseball team, which competes in the Trinity League, within the Southern Section of the California Interscholastic Federation. In 2007, his junior year, Maurer was used as a relief pitcher and had a 0.54 earned run average (ERA) and four saves. As a senior in 2008, he earned second-team All-Trinity League honors and helped Orange Lutheran finish second in the league. Though he was overshadowed by teammates Gerrit Cole and Aaron Gates, he earned notice from Major League Baseball teams. He accepted a scholarship from the California State University, Long Beach, to play college baseball for the Long Beach State Dirtbags baseball team.

Professional career

Seattle Mariners
The Seattle Mariners drafted Maurer in the 23rd round, with the 702nd overall selection, of the 2008 Major League Baseball Draft. Rather than attend Long Beach State, Maurer signed with the Mariners.

In 2009, Maurer pitched for the Pulaski Mariners of the Rookie-level Appalachian League. Maurer pitched for the Clinton LumberKings of the Class A Midwest League in 2010, and the Adelaide Bite of the Australian Baseball League (ABL) in the winter of 2010–11, reaching the ABL championship series. Maurer started the 2011 season with the LumberKings, and was promoted to the High Desert Mavericks of the Class A-Advanced California League in May. Following his second start with High Desert, he was named the California League Pitcher of the Week for the week ending June 1.

Heading into the 2012 season, scouts viewed Maurer as a "sleeper" prospect. Maurer pitched for the Jackson Generals of the Class AA Southern League in 2012. Though overshadowed by teammates Danny Hultzen and Taijuan Walker, Maurer was named the league's Most Outstanding Pitcher after going 9–2 with a 3.20 earned run average with 117 strikeouts in  innings pitched. After the season, Maurer was added to the Mariners' 40-man roster to be protected from the Rule 5 Draft.

In spring training in 2013, Maurer competed with Erasmo Ramírez, Jeremy Bonderman, and Blake Beavan for one of the final two spots in the Mariners' five-man starting rotation, behind Félix Hernández, Hisashi Iwakuma, and Joe Saunders.  Allowing only two runs in 20 innings with 22 strikeouts and six walks in the Cactus League, Maurer made the Mariners' 25-man roster as a starting pitcher, skipping the Class AAA level. Maurer became the first member of the Mariners' 2008 draft class to reach the major leagues and the first starting pitcher to skip Class AAA and debut for the Mariners since John Cummings and Mike Hampton in 1993. He reached MLB before more heralded prospects, such as Walker, Hultzen, and James Paxton. In his major league debut, on April 4, he allowed six runs in six innings to the Oakland Athletics, including on home runs by Yoenis Céspedes and Josh Reddick, in a loss. After a second poor performance, Maurer earned his first win in his third start, on April 14.

San Diego Padres
On December 30, 2014, the Mariners traded Maurer to the San Diego Padres in exchange for Seth Smith. In the first half of the 2015 season, Maurer pitched to a 2.11 ERA. His performance diminished in the second half as he suffered from shoulder inflammation. Maurer's 2015 season ended with a 7-4 record and an even 3 ERA in 53 games.

Maurer entered spring training in 2016 as a candidate for the starting rotation. The Padres opted to keep Maurer in the bullpen for the 2016 season. The Padres named Maurer their new closer after the team traded away closer Fernando Rodney to the Miami Marlins on June 30, 2016. He took on the role for the rest of the season, saving 13 games. For the 2017 season, Maurer entered as the incumbent closer for the Padres. He saved 20 games for the Padres despite having an ERA of 5.72 although his fielding independent pitching (FIP) had him with a 3.23 ERA. In his three seasons with the Padres, Maurer had an 8-13 record with 33 saves.

Kansas City Royals
On July 24, 2017, the Padres traded Maurer, Ryan Buchter, and Trevor Cahill to the Kansas City Royals for Matt Strahm, Travis Wood, and Esteury Ruiz. He was outrighted to AAA Omaha Storm Chasers on May 3, 2018. In 37 games in 2018, Maurer registered an ERA of 7.76 in  innings.

Pittsburgh Pirates
On January 30, 2019, Maurer signed a minor league deal with the Pittsburgh Pirates.

Personal life
He is from Costa Mesa, California, and has been described as a "laid back California surfer type".

References

External links

1990 births
Living people
People from Costa Mesa, California
Baseball players from California
Major League Baseball pitchers
Seattle Mariners players
San Diego Padres players
Kansas City Royals players
Arizona League Mariners players
Pulaski Mariners players
Adelaide Bite players
Clinton LumberKings players
High Desert Mavericks players
Jackson Generals (Southern League) players
Tacoma Rainiers players
Peoria Javelinas players
Omaha Storm Chasers players
West Virginia Black Bears players
Indianapolis Indians players
American expatriate baseball players in Australia